The Robert Schumann Prize of the City of Zwickau is a classical music award. Since 1964 it has been awarded by the Lord Mayor of Zwickau. Robert Schumann was born in Zwickau. Between 1964 and 2002 the prize was awarded annually, since 2003 biennially. The award is given to outstanding singers, instrumentalists and ensembles as well as musicologists and musical institutions, who have rendered special service (sic) to cherishing and presenting Schumann’s musical and literary heritage as well as to the knowledge of his life and works. The prize is endowed with a total of €10,000. The winners receive a certificate and a bronze medal with the portrait of Schumann, created by the sculptor Gerhard Lichtenfeld.

Jury
The jury includes:
 the Lord Mayor of Zwickau
 the mayor of social affairs and culture
 a member of the Culture and Education Committee of the City of Zwickau
 the chairman of the Robert Schumann Society Zwickau e.V.
 the director of the Robert Schumann House

Recipients

 1964 Georg Eismann, Annerose Schmidt
 1965 Karl Laux, Lore Fischer
 1966 Daniel Zhitomirsky, Dieter Zechlin
 1967 Olivier Alain
 1968 Sviatoslav Richter
 1969 Peter Schreier, Herbert Schulze
 1970 Dmitri Bashkirov, Martin Schoppe
 1971 Günther Leib, Tatiana Nikolayeva
 1972 , Maria Maxakowa
 1973 Emil Gilels, Elisabeth Breul
 1974 Amadeus Webersinke, Nelly Akopian-Tamarina
 1975 Zara Dolukhanova, Hélène Boschi
 1976 Sigrid Kehl, Eliso Virsaladze
 1977 Rudolf Kehrer, 
 1978 Gertraud Geißler, Hans Joachim Köhler
 1979 Hanne-Lore Kuhse, František Rauch
 1980 Theo Adam, Miklós Forrai
 1981 Kurt Masur, Halina Czerny-Stefańska
 1982 Mitsuko Shirai, Peter Rösel
 1983 Rudolf Fischer, Eva Fleischer
 1984 Gustáv Papp, Dezső Ránki
 1985 Pavel Lisitsian, Jacob Lateiner
 1986 Jörg Demus, Gerd Nauhaus
 1987 Dietrich Fischer-Dieskau
 1988 
 1989 Pavel Egorov, Bernard Ringeissen
 1990 Hartmut Höll, Günther Müller
 1991 Joan Chissell
 1992 Abegg Trio, Gisela Schäfer
 1993 Jozef De Beenhouwer
 1994 Wolfgang Sawallisch
 1995 Hansheinz Schneeberger, Dieter-Gerhardt Worm
 1996 Nancy B. Reich, Bernhard R. Appel
 1997 Nikolaus Harnoncourt
 1998 Linda Correll Roesner, Olaf Bär
 1999 Altenberg Trio, Ernst Burger
 2000 Olga Loseva, Steven Isserlis
 2001 John Eliot Gardiner
 2002 Alfred Brendel
 2003 Joachim Draheim, Juliane Banse
 2005 Daniel Barenboim
 2006 Margit L. McCorkle, Anton Kuerti
 2009 Reinhard Kapp, Michael Struck
 2011 András Schiff
 2013 Jon W. Finson, Ulf Wallin
 2015  Düsseldorf
 2017 Heinz Holliger
 2019 Ragna Schirmer, Janina Klassen
 2021 Thomas Synofzik
 2023 Christian Gerhaher/Gerold Huber, Florian Uhlig

References

External links
  
 Robert Schumann Preis at zwickau.de 

German music awards
Classical music awards
Robert Schumann
Awards established in 1964
1964 establishments in East Germany
Zwickau
Municipal awards